Tropical music is a term in the Latin music industry that refers to music genres deriving from or influenced by the Spanish-speaking areas of the Caribbean. It includes the islands of Cuba, Puerto Rico, the Dominican Republic, and the Caribbean coastal regions of Colombia and Venezuela.

In the 1940s and 1950s, the term tropical music was created to cover all music from the hispanophone Caribbean excluding Cuban music, which had its own category and niche within the American (and to a lesser extent European) music market. However, later in the 20th century after the Cuban Revolution, tropical music gained a broader meaning and began to be used in order to distinguish Caribbean genres such as cumbia and son cubano from inland genres such as tejano and norteño.

Characteristics
Due to its geographical roots, tropical music generally combines elements from European and African traditions. An example of this is the process of binarization of ternary rhythms brought from Africa, which took place originally in Cuba, later spreading throughout the rest of the Caribbean and Latin America. The presence of syncopated polyrhythms of African origin make most tropical music naturally dance-oriented. Tropical music instrumentation also includes both European (tres, piano, trumpet, timbales) and African-descended (congas, bongos, marimba) instruments. During the late 20th century, contemporary instruments such as synthesizers and drum machines were incorporated.

History
Despite being a concept created in the 20th century within the music industry, tropical music encompasses genres and styles that can be traced back to the 16th century, when the Caribbean (and thus America) was discovered and colonized by Europeans. It was not until the 19th century that tropical music became a global phenomenon with the popularization of Cuban contradanza (also known as habanera). Cuba would continue to spearhead the development of tropical music with other ballroom music styles, as well as the bolero and son cubano. The Dominican Republic contributed with merengue and bachata, two very successful genres, while Puerto Rican music is exemplified by relatively minor genres such as bomba and plena. The very popular cumbia and vallenato originated on the coasts of Colombia.

Tropical music would have a long-lasting impact in the music of other regions beyond the Caribbean such as the United States (where rhumba and salsa were primarily developed), Africa (where soukous was developed), and South America. For example, in Chile, tropical music genres were progressively introduced depending on their popularity in the Caribbean and North America. Thus, genres such as guaracha, mambo, cha cha cha and later cumbia made their way into the radios and concert halls of Chile between the 1930s and 1960s.

Tropical music enjoys a dedicated global following among music fans and record collectors. In some cities, DJs will hold music nights and play a variety of tropical music, featuring vintage (1970s and earlier) cumbia, salsa, mambo, Caribbean and African music, often on vinyl records. Modern artists such as Will Holland (AKA Quantic) derive significant influence from music styles within the tropical genre.

Radio format
Tropical music also refers to a music format common in Latin music radio stations. Among the most popular tropical styles are salsa, merengue,  bachata, cumbia, and vallenato.

See also
Caribbean music
Grammy Award for Best Tropical Latin Album
Latin Grammy Award for Best Tropical Song
Latin pop
List of radio formats
Regional Mexican
Tropical Albums
Tropical Airplay, tropical music charts
Urbano music

References

Further reading

External links
Musica Tropical in Colombia, Radio show with professor Peter Wade, musician Martin Vejarano of the band La Cumbiamba Eneye, and host Georges Collinet, Afropop Worldwide, June 21, 2007
Sound recordings of Música Tropical, from WorldCat

 
Latin American music
Radio formats